Tomris Zehra İncer (16 March 1948 – 5 October 2015) was a Turkish actress.

İncer was born in 1948 in Bulgaria. In 1974, she started her career on stage by joining the Istanbul City Theatres, and continued her career by appearing in both cinema and television productions. A breakthrough in her career came in 2003 with a role in the TV series Bir İstanbul Masalı. İncer died on 5 October 2015, shortly after being diagnosed with lung cancer and a brain tumor.

Theatre 
 Öldün, Duydun mu? : Yiğit Sertdemir - Altıdan Sonra Theatre - 2013
 Gerçek Hayattan Alınmıştır : Yiğit Sertdemir - Altıdan Sonra Theatre - 2012
 Les Liaisons dangereuses : Pierre Choderlos de Laclos - Istanbul City Theatres - 2010
 The Cloven Viscount : Italo Calvino - Istanbul City Theatres - 2010
 Dünya'nı Ortasında Bir Yer : Özen Yula - Istanbul City Theatres - 2010
 Divane Ağaç : Turgay Nar - Istanbul City Theatres - 2009
 Leonce and Lena : Georg Büchner - Istanbul City Theatres - 2008
 The Immortal Story : Karen Blixen - Istanbul City Theatres - 2007
 Eskici Dükkanı : Orhan Kemal - Istanbul City Theatres - 2006
 Far Away : Caryl Churchill - Istanbul City Theatres - 2005
 Medea : Euripides - Istanbul City Theatres - 2003
 Richard III : William Shakespeare - Istanbul City Theatres - 2001
 Open the Door : Krzysztof Choiński - Istanbul City Theatres - 2001
 Gölge Ustası : Istanbul City Theatres
 Canlı Maymun Lokantası : Güngör Dilmen - Istanbul City Theatres
 Altı Derece Uzak : Istanbul City Theatres
 Mikado'nun Çöpleri : Melih Cevdet Anday - Istanbul City Theatres
 A Midsummer Night's Dream : William Shakespeare - Istanbul City Theatres - 1980

Filmography 
 Racon - 2015
 Mahmut İle Meryem - 2012
 Böyle Bitmesin - 2012
 Aşk ve Ceza - 2010
 Usta - 2008
 Tramvay - 2006
 Binbir Gece - 2006 
 Yedi Günah, Yedi Tepe, Bir Metropol - 2005 
 Bir İstanbul Masalı - 2003
 Aşk ve Gurur - 2002 
 Gönlümdeki Köşk Olmasa - 2002 
 Karşılaşma - 2002 
 Çamur - 2002 
 O da Beni Seviyor - 2001 
 Bana Old and Wise'ı Çal - 1998 
 Kuşatma Altında Aşk - 1997 
 Aylaklar - 1994 
 Tersine Dünya - 1993 
 Gizli Yüz - 1990 
 Cumartesi Cumartesi (Anet's voice) - 1984 
 At Gözlüğü - 1978
 Azap - 1973

Awards 
 9th Adana Golden Boll Film Festival - 1995, Best Actress, Aylaklar 
 15th Ankara International Film Festival - 2003, Best Supporting Actress, Çamur 
 8th Sadri Alışık Awards - 2003, Best Supporting Actress, Gönlümdeki Köşk Olmasa
 8th Afife Theatre Awards, Most Successful Actress in a Supporting role, Richard III and Medea, 2004
 Theater Critics Association's Honorary Award - 2015
 Afife Theatre Awards, Most Successful Actress in a Supporting Role, King Lear - 2015

References

External links 

1948 births
2015 deaths
Turkish stage actresses
Turkish voice actresses
Turkish film actresses
Turkish television actresses
Turkish people of Bulgarian descent
Deaths from lung cancer in Turkey
Deaths from brain cancer in Turkey